An itch is an unpleasant sensation that evokes the desire or reflex to scratch

Itch or Itching may also refer to:

Arts, entertainment, and media
Itch (EP), a 1994 Radiohead EP
Itch (Kim Mitchell album), a 1994 solo album by Kim Mitchell
Itch (TV series), a 2020 Australian children's TV series
"Itchin'", a single by Jimmy Jones
The Itch (House), an episode of the US TV series House
Itch, a 2012 novel by Simon Mayo

Other uses
ITCH (gene), an ubiquitin-activating enzyme
itch.io, an online videogame distribution marketplace
Jonny "Itch" Fox, British musician

See also
Itchy (disambiguation)
Eetch, a traditional Armenian side dish made principally from bulgur